The Scars Between Us is the fourth full-length album by American groove metal band Skinlab. It was released September 15, 2009, seven years after the band's previous studio album.

Track listing
 "Face of Aggression" - 3:44
 "Amphetamine Gods" - 3:22
 "Scream at the World" - 5:44
 "Wolvesblood" - 3:24
 "Karma Burns" - 6:46
 "In for the Kill" - 4:19
 "Paper Trails" - 5:55
 "Still Suffering" - 4:42
 "Bloodclot" - 1:56
 "My Vendetta" - 5:01
 "The Scars Between Us" - 5:35

Critical reception
Reviews of the album ranged from negative to mixed.

AllMusic gave a mixed review, classifying the songs as technically competent but unoriginal nu metal tracks with far too long a run-time. There were also accusations that riffs had gone far past being influenced and outright impersonated various major bands such as Metallica and Machine Head.

MetalSucks gave a negative review, again criticising the lack of originality and flagrant impersonations. The review also criticised the loss of groove seen in the band's early work, leading to a general dullness in a number of songs.

Exclaim! also gave a mixed reception of the review, judging it "moderately interesting" but once again criticised the lack of originality.

References

2009 albums
Skinlab albums